Minois dryas, the dryad, is a butterfly of the family Nymphalidae.

Subspecies
Subspecies include:
 Minois dryas phaedra (Linnaeus, 1764) (southern Alps)
 Minois dryas bipunctatus (Motschulsky, 1861) (Eastern Asia and Japan)
 Minois dryas septentrionalis (Wnukowsky, 1929)
 Minois dryas shaanxiensis (Qian)

Distribution and habitat
This species can be found in southern and central Europe up to central Asia and Japan.

Description
The basic color of the upperside of the wings is dark brown. The females are larger and paler than the males. On each forewing there are two large eyelets with bluish pupils, while in each hindwing there is just a small eyelet. The underside of the wings is quite similar, but the eyelets on the forewings show a yellowish border and the hindwings are mainly gray brown.

This species is rather similar to Satyrus actaea and Satyrus ferula. In the last one the forewing eyespots centered with white.

Biology
The butterfly is on wing from June to September depending on the location. They usually feed on nectar of scabious (Scabiosa species), hemp agrimony (Eupatorium cannabinum) and other tall flowers. The larvae feed on grass species, such as Molinia caerulea, Arrhenatherum elatius, Oryza sativa, Avena, Dactylis, Poa, Festuca, Carex, Calamagrostis and Bromus species.

References

External links
Lepiforum.de
 Paolo Mazzei, Daniel Morel, Raniero Panfili Moths and Butterflies of Europe and North Africa

Satyrini
Butterflies of Europe
Butterflies described in 1763
Butterflies of Asia
Taxa named by Giovanni Antonio Scopoli